Hedley is a city in Donley County, Texas, United States. Its population was 329 at the 2010 census, down from 379 at the 2000 census.

Geography

Hedley is located in southeastern Donley County at  (34.867099, –100.659761). U.S. Highway 287 passes through the community, leading northwest  to Clarendon, the county seat, and southeast  to Childress. Texas State Highway 203 leads east from Hedley  to Wellington.

Demographics

As of the census of 2000, 379 people, 161 households, and 98 families were residing in the city. The population density was 520.1 people/sq mi (200.5/km2). The 209 housing units averaged 286.8/sq mi (110.5/km2). The racial makeup of the city was 91.29% White, 1.85% African American, 1.58% Native American, 5.01% from other races, and 0.26% from two or more races. Hispanics or Latinos of any race were 9.76% of the population.

Of the 161 households,  24.8% had children under the age of 18 living with them, 49.7% were married couples living together, 8.1% had a female householder with no husband present, and 39.1% were not families. About 37.9% of all households were made up of individuals, and 25.5% had someone living alone who was 65 years of age or older. The average household size was 2.35, and the average family size was 3.13.

In the city, the age distribution was 28.8% under 18, 6.9% from 18 to 24, 19.0% from 25 to 44, 21.6% from 45 to 64, and 23.7% who were 65 or older. The median age was 42 years. For every 100 females, there were 83.1 males. For every 100 females age 18 and over, there were 74.2 males.

The median income for a household in the city was $25,750, and for a family was $39,375. Males had a median income of $22,500 versus $20,208 for females. The per capita income for the city was $11,568. About 10.8% of families and 20.4% of the population were below the poverty line, including 13.0% of those under age 18 and 40.5% of those age 65 or over.

Education
The city is served by the Hedley Independent School District and is home to the Hedley High School Owls.

References

External links
 City of Hedley Web Page

Cities in Texas
Cities in Donley County, Texas